Saeedabad is a village in the Khyber-Pakhtunkhwa. It is located at 34°8'19N 71°36'24E with an altitude of 283 metres (931 feet).

References

Villages in Khyber Pakhtunkhwa